Antônio Fernandes Lima Cruz better known by his stage name Fernandes Lima (Feira de Santana, June 18, 1962) is a Brazilian singer, songwriter and pastor.

In 2004, the singer released his first album. With the hit ("Tá Determinado"). Two years later, Graça Music announced the second album, which yielded another Platinum album and a Gold Album. by sales of more than 100,000 copies sold nationwide.

He has done numerous works with several renowned Brazilian artists such as Anderson Freire, Aretusa Cardoso, André Freire and Dedé de Jesus. The production of this disc was by the producers, Dedy Coutinho. The recognition was almost immediate in less than a year, recorded two CDs: "O Forró do Fernandes" (2001) and "Determinação" (2002).

Discography

Studio albums 
 1999 – Determinação
 2004 – Fernandes Lima, Vol. 3
 2007 – Fernandes Lima, Vol. 4
 2009 – Minhas Canções na Voz de Fernandes Lima
 2011 – O Forró do Fernandes
 2012 – Minhas Canções na Voz de Fernandes Lima, Vol. 2
 2015 – Deus É a Resposta
 2017 – Esse Deus É Tremendo

References

External links 

1962 births
Living people
21st-century Brazilian male singers
21st-century Brazilian singers
20th-century Brazilian male singers
20th-century Brazilian singers